Sakmarino is a rural locality (a selo) in Kiprinsky Selsoviet, Shelabolikhinsky District, Altai Krai, Russia. The population was 5 as of 2013. There are 2 streets.

Geography 
Sakmarino is located 45 km northwest of Shelabolikha (the district's administrative centre) by road. Kiprino is the nearest rural locality.

References 

Rural localities in Shelabolikhinsky District